Adele von Finck (1879-1943) was a German artist.

Biography 
Von Finck was born on 6 February 1879 in Buenos Aires, Argentina. She attended the Akademie der Bildenden Künste München (Academy of Fine Arts, Munich) and the Académie Royale des Beaux-Arts in Brussels. Her teachers included Gustave-Claude-Etienne Courtois, Franz von Lenbach, and Jean-François Portaels. She exhibited her work in Prague and Berlin.

She died on 22 November 1943 in Berlin, Germany.

Gallery

References

External links
 

1879 births
1943 deaths
Artists from Buenos Aires
19th-century German women artists
20th-century German women artists